The Mechanical Hand is the second studio album by Horse the Band, released in 2005 through Combat Records. Music videos were released for the songs "Birdo", "A Million Exploding Suns", and "Lord Gold Throneroom". This is the band's first release with bassist Dashiell Arkenstone and drummer Eli Green.

Track listing

Personnel
 Nathan Winneke – vocals
 David Isen – guitar
 Erik "Lord Gold" Engstrom – keyboards
 Dashiell "Dash" Arkenstone – bass
 Eli Green – drums

Allusions
 The title "Birdo" is taken from the video game character Birdo, who debuted in the Nintendo game Super Mario Bros. 2. The intro of the song is an audio clip from the animated film The Hobbit. The song is mostly inspired by lead singer Nathan Winneke's treatment by his stepfather. There was a video made for the song, in which the band play next to a grade school stage, while kids put on a play entitled "HORSE the play" where they also make reference to other songs on the album. Some people, in online forums, have criticised Irish rock band Snow Patrol, for their video "Signal Fire", made two years later, in which the band similarly plays while a grade school play is in progress.
 "A Million Exploding Suns" is a reference to the Marvel comic book character The Sentry. The song also features a keyboard rendition of part of the first level theme song from the game Bionic Commando.
 "The House of Boo" holds reference to the stage and home of the ghost characters, Boos, in several of the Mario video game series titles. It also includes the score used in the games. The song itself is actually about Nathan's childhood, and an incident involving someone breaking into his home, and the resulting trauma.
 The title of the album gives reference to the Mechanical Hound in the novel Fahrenheit 451. The Phoenix on the album cover is also a reference to the Phoenix Crest, worn by the future firefighters in the novel.

References

Horse the Band albums
2005 albums
Albums produced by Matt Bayles